Githinji Gitahi  is a Kenyan medical doctor who serves as the Global Chief Executive Officer of Amref Health Africa as well a former co-chair of the UHC2030 Steering Committee.  In July 2021, he was appointed as a Commissioner in the Africa COVID-19 Commission.

Early life and education
Githinji was born on 7 August 1970 in Othaya, Nyeri County, Kenya. In 1996, he graduated from University of Nairobi with a Bachelor of Medicine and surgery and a Masters degree of Business Administration in Marketing  from United States International University (on going).  He holds a Certificate for Strategic Perspective for Non Profit Management from Harvard University.

Career
Githinji  has worked both in public and private sector in various positions such as a medical officer and Quality Manager at Avenue Group (1996-2000), as a Medical Services Manager at Madison Insurance Limited (2000-2001), as a medical Medical Marketing Manager and Group Product Manager for Panadol and Hedex at Glaxo SmithKline(2001-2004), as a Marketing Manager at Glaxo SmithKline East Africa (2005-2006) as the Head of  Marketing Expert Relations at Glaxo SmithKline Sub-Saharan Africa and Middle East (October 2006-August 2007).

From August 2006 to 2009, Dr Gitahi was the Managing Director for Monitor Publications Limited in Uganda as well as General Manager for Marketing and Circulation in East Africa for the Nation Media Group(August 2009-December 2011).  Between March 2008 to December 2001, he held  senior positions at GlaxoSmithKline and worked at the Avenue Group. Dr. Githinji currently serves as Global Chief Executive Officer of Amref Health Africa since June 2015.  He is co-chair of the UHC2030 Steering Committee.   He has presented as a speaker at medical conferences  both inside and outside Africa. such as Health Systems Global Symposium 2018, and Health & Climate Change conference 2019.

Committee Member
Dr. Githinji  previously served as a  member of the Private Sector Advisory Board of Africa Centres for Disease Control and Prevention (Africa CDC) and of the World Health Organization's Community Health Worker Hub. He is a member of the Board of Directors of The Standard Group and holds Board member positions in Amref Health Africa. He is a member of the Board of Trustees of Safaricom Foundation,  a member of the Governing Board of Africa CDC, and a board member of WomenLift Health and Safaricom Foundation.
In May 2022,  he was appointed to the Board and Scientific Advisory Committee of Coalition for Epidemic Preparedness Innovations (CEPI), which aims to stop future epidemics by developing new vaccines.

Honors
On 12 December 2018, Githinji was awarded  a presidential commendation of Moran of the Order of the Burning Spear in recognition for his  contribution to the health sector  at  Amref Health Africa.

Personal life
Githinji is a brother to Stephen Kiama the Vice Chancellor at University of Nairobi.

References

Living people
Kenyan chief executives
20th-century Kenyan physicians
21st-century Kenyan physicians
People from Nairobi
Swahili people
1970 births